Gerongia is a genus of box jellyfish in the Carukiidae family.

Species
The World Register of Marine Species lists the following species:
Gerongia rifkinae Gershwin & Alderslade, 2005

References

Carukiidae
Medusozoa genera
Monotypic cnidarian genera
Animals described in 2005